Albergaria dos Doze is a former civil parish in the municipality of Pombal, Portugal.  In 2013, the parish merged into the new parish Santiago e São Simão de Litém e Albergaria dos Doze. The population in 2011 was 1,765, in an area of 22.84 km².

References

Former parishes of Pombal, Portugal
Populated places disestablished in 2013
2013 disestablishments in Portugal